The Institute of Optometry is a centre for optometry, based in south London, England. It was  established in 1922 as the London Refraction Hospital.

History

London Refraction Hospital
The London Refraction Hospital (LRH) was formed in October 1922, the first institute of its kind in the world. The first committee of management consisted of Owen Aves (Chairman), F.W. Bateman, J.H. Cuff, F.W. Dadd, G.E. Houghton and W. H. Nichols. The first secretary was F.T. Gregg. James Forrest, who was a surgeon oculist, was also involved in the founding.

The LRH was enlarged and re-modelled in October 1928 and re-opened in February 1929 by the Rt. Hon. the Countess of Mayo. In November 1938 the LRH was reconstituted by order of the Charity Commission.

The second Lord Charnwood was active in the management of the London Refraction Hospital after the second world war.

In 1985 it was suggested by Rishi Agarwal in Optometry Today that 'in addition to making efforts for a Royal College of Optometrists, efforts should also be made for a Royal status for the LRH.

Institute of Optometry
In 1988 the LRH changed its name to the Institute of Optometry.

In 2008 the Institute of Optometry, in partnership with London South Bank University, established a post-graduate Doctor of Optometry programme. This was the first professional doctorate in optometry by that description offered in the UK, distinct from a traditional PhD.

References

External links 
 Institute of Optometry website

1922 establishments in England
Buildings and structures in the London Borough of Southwark
Optometry schools
Research institutes in London
Medical research institutes in the United Kingdom
Charities based in London
Research institutes established in 1922
Eye care in the United Kingdom